Cathall is a ward in the London Borough of Waltham Forest. The population of this ward at the 2011 Census was 12,700.

Politics

Approximate result in  this ward for 2022 general election.

References

Wards of the London Borough of Waltham Forest